Back 2 Back Hits is a compilation album by rappers M.C. Hammer and Vanilla Ice. The album was released in 1997 for CEMA Special Markets and was re-released in 2006 for Capitol Records. The first five songs on the album are by M.C. Hammer; the last five are by Vanilla Ice. The 2006 release replaced "Pray" with "Help the Children."

Track listing 
 "U Can't Touch This" - 4:16
 "Addams Groove" - 3:58
 "Too Legit to Quit" - 5:05
 "Pray" - 5:14
 "Have You Seen Her" - 4:43
 "Ice Ice Baby" - 4:31
 "Cool as Ice (Everybody Get Loose)" - 5:32
 "I Love You" (Live) - 5:57
 "Play That Funky Music" (Live) - 5:00
 "Dancin'" - 5:00

References

1998 greatest hits albums
MC Hammer compilation albums
Split albums
Vanilla Ice compilation albums
Capitol Records compilation albums